Saint-Priest-la-Feuille is a commune in the Creuse department in central France.

Geography
The river Semme has its source in the commune.

Population

See also
Communes of the Creuse department

References

Communes of Creuse